Bruce Smith (March 28, 1949 – January 3, 2013) was a Canadian football player who played for the Hamilton Tiger-Cats, Edmonton Eskimos, Ottawa Rough Riders and Toronto Argonauts. He won the Grey Cup with Hamilton in 1972. He played college football at the University of Colorado Boulder. After retiring from the CFL he became a successful real estate agent in Toronto. A born-again Christian, Smith became an ordained chaplain at King Bay Chaplaincy in 1999. He also worked with Upper Canada College's Chaplain Service. He died of pancreatic cancer in 2013. His memoir, Our Father: The Prodigal Son Returns, was published posthumously the same year.

References

1949 births
2013 deaths
American players of Canadian football
People from Huntsville, Texas
Hamilton Tiger-Cats players
Edmonton Elks players
Ottawa Rough Riders players
Toronto Argonauts players
Colorado Buffaloes football players
Players of American football from Texas
Burials at York Cemetery, Toronto